Albert Moore may refer to:

 Albert Joseph Moore (1841–1893), English painter
 Albert Moore (Medal of Honor) (1862–1916), US Marine
 Albert Moore (footballer, born 1863) (1863–?), English football player for Notts County
 Albert Moore (footballer, born 1898) (1898–?), English football player for Stoke
 Al Moore (baseball) (1902–1974), baseball player
 Al Moore (American football) (1908–1991), American football player

See also
Al Moore (disambiguation)